= Attic Vase Inscriptions =

Attic Vase Inscriptions (AVI) is a web-based epigraphic database of ancient Attic vase inscriptions maintained by the AVI project at the University of Basel. It is an extension of Henry R. Immerwahr's CAVI (Corpus of Attic Vase Inscriptions).
